"Brae" is also the Lowland Scots language word for the slope or brow of a hill.

Brae (Old Norse: Breiðeið, meaning "the wide isthmus") is a village on the island of Mainland in Shetland, Scotland, United Kingdom.

Description
Brae was historically a fishing village, but with the construction of the nearby Sullom Voe Oil Terminal in the 1970s it grew rapidly, merging with the nearby village of Northbrae. It is located at the northern end of Busta Voe, on the narrow isthmus that joins Northmavine to the rest of the Mainland. The village stages its own Up Helly Aa.

The A970 which connects Lerwick to Northmavine forms the main street of Brae. Brae's police and fire stations, schools, and NHS clinic service much of the northern part of the Mainland.

Etymology
Brae is the Lowland Scots word for the slope or brow of a hill.  The word 'Brae' in Shetland dialect has a different meaning; it may come from the Old Norse word breiðr meaning broad. The village may take its name from the broad isthmus between Sullom Voe and Busta Voe as opposed to the narrower one a little further west at Mavis Grind. Alternatively the name may mean "a slope to the sea".

Notable people
Jonathan Sutherland, television and radio broadcaster and main anchor of Sportscene, is from Brae.

Erraid Davies is a member of the Delting Dolphins swimming club based in Brae, which claims to be "the most northerly active swimming club in the UK".

References

External links

Scotland - Brae
Canmore - Brae Whaling Station and Jetty site record
Canmore - Busta Standing Stone site record

Villages in Mainland, Shetland
Portages